Alexios I Komnenos was a Byzantine emperor (1081–1118).

Alexios Komnenos or Alexius Comnenus may also refer to:
 Alexios Komnenos (governor of Dyrrhachium), nephew of Alexios I
 Alexios Komnenos (died 1136), son of Isaac Komnenos
 Alexios Komnenos (co-emperor), son of John II Komnenos
 Alexios Komnenos (son of Andronikos I), illegitimate son of Andronikos I Komnenos
 Alexios Komnenos (protosebastos), grandson of John II, lover of the Empress Maria Komnene and leader of her regency council
 Alexios II Komnenos, Byzantine emperor (1180–1183)
 Alexios Komnenos (died 1188), illegitimate son of Manuel I Komnenos
 Alexios I of Trebizond, Emperor of Trebizond (1204–1222)
 Alexios II of Trebizond, Emperor of Trebizond (1297–1330)
 Alexios III of Trebizond, Emperor of Trebizond (1349–1390)
 Alexios IV of Trebizond, Emperor of Trebizond (1417–1429)
 Alexios V of Trebizond, Emperor of Trebizond (1460)